Akiak Airport  is a state-owned public-use airport serving Akiak, a city in the Bethel Census Area of the U.S. state of Alaska.

According to Federal Aviation Administration records, this airport had 1,983 passenger boardings (enplanements) in calendar year 2007, an increase of 34% from the 1,483 enplanements in 2006.

Facilities 
It has one runway (3/21) with a gravel surface measuring 3,196 by 75 feet (974 x 23 m).

Airlines and destinations 

Prior to its bankruptcy and cessation of all operations, Ravn Alaska served the airport from multiple locations.

Statistics

References

External links 
 FAA Alaska airport diagram (GIF)
 
 

Airports in the Bethel Census Area, Alaska